Boris Davidovich Belkin (born 26 January 1948) is a Soviet-born violin virtuoso.

Teachers
He was taught by Isaac Stern and Yuri Yankelevich.

Early years

As a child prodigy he began studying the violin at the age of six, and made his first public appearance with Kirill Kondrašin when he was seven. He studied at the Central Music School at the Moscow Conservatory with Professors Yuri Yankelevich  Felix Andrievsky and Isaac Stern.
While still a student he played all over the Soviet Union with leading national orchestras, and in 1973 won first prize at the Soviet National competition for Violinists. However, he was not granted a visa to participate in the 1971 nor 1973 Paganini Competitions in Italy, and he decided to emigrate to Israel in 1974. He moved on to London, Paris and back to London. He met his Belgian wife at a Yehudi Menuhin festival in Switzerland and settled in Liège. By 1990 he had become a Belgian citizen.

Career

In 1974 he emigrated to the west and since then has performed all over the world with many of the leading orchestras including the Boston Symphony, Cleveland Orchestra, Berlin Philharmonic, Israel Philharmonic, Los Angeles Philharmonic, Philadelphia Orchestra, Pittsburgh Symphony, Montreal Symphony, Bavarian Radio Symphony Orchestra, Royal Concertgebouw Orchestra, Royal Liverpool Philharmonic Orchestra, and all major British Orchestras.

Boris Belkin has been featured in many television productions: a film biography of Jean Sibelius, performing the Sibelius Concerto with the Swedish Radio Orchestra and Ashkenazy, with Bernstein and the New York Philharmonic, performing the Tchaikovsky Concerto, with Bernstein and the Orchestre National de France playing Ravel's Tzigane, and with Haitink and the Royal Concertgebouw Orchestra playing Mozart and Paganini violin concerto No.1.

Conductors with whom he has collaborated, include Bernstein, Ashkenazy, Mehta, Maazel, Muti, Ozawa, Sanderling, Rudolf Barshai, Temirkanov, Dohnányi, Dutoit, Gelmetti, Herbig, Tennstedt, Rattle, Haitink, Berglund, Mata, Chung, Hirokami, Fedoseyev, Ahronovich, Groves, Leinsdorf, Steinberg, Welser-Möst, Lazarev, Doron Salomon, Simonov and many others.
In 1997 Isaac Stern invited Mr. Belkin to perform with him at the Miyazaki Festival.

Boris Belkin also dedicates himself to chamber music, performing with artists such as Yuri Bashmet, Mischa Maisky and many others.

Highlights of the 2007–2008 season include a tour with St. Petersburg Philharmonic and conductor Temirkanov, a tour in South America, concerts with the NHK Symphony Orchestra in Tokyo and performing the Sibelius Concerto with Sydney Symphony and Ashkenazy, concerts in London, Berlin, Barcelona, Rome.

Since 1987 Boris Belkin has held master classes at the Accademia Musicale Chigiana in Siena, Italy, and since 1997 he is a faculty member at the Maastricht Academy of Music in the Netherlands. Janine Jansen was one of his students.

Discography

 Paganini Violin Concerto No. 1 with the Israel Philharmonic and Zubin Mehta
 Tchaikovsky and Sibelius Violin Concertos with the Philharmonia Orchestra and Ashkenazy, Strauss Violin Concerto with Berlin Radio Symphony Orchestra and Ashkenazy
 Prokofiev Violin Concertos No. 1 and No. 2 with the London Symphony Orchestra and Kondrashin
 Brahms Concerto with the London Symphony Orchestra and Ivan Fischer
 Prokofiev Violin Concertos with the Zurich Tonhalle and Michael Stern
 Shostakovich Violin Concerto No. 1 and the Glazunov Violin Concerto with the Royal Philharmonic Orchestra and Junichi Hirokami
 Tchaikovsky Violin Concerto with the London Philharmonic and Michael Stern
 Mozart Violin Concerto No. 5 and Sinfonia Concertante, K.364 with the Salzburg Chamber Soloists
 Brahms Violin Sonatas with Michel Dalberto.

References

 David M. Cummings, Dennis K. McIntire (Ed.): International who's who in music and musician's directory. In the classical and light classical fields. Twelfth edition 1990/91. International Who's Who in Music, Cambridge, England 1991.
 Alain Pâris: Dictionnaire des interpretes et de l'interpretation musicale au XX siecle. Éditions Robert Laffont, Paris 1989.

External links
 Harrisonturner Management (archived)
 Biography at Conservatorium Maastricht 
 Patrick Garvey Management
 Biography at Accademia Musicale Chigiana

1948 births
Living people
Soviet classical violinists
20th-century classical violinists
Male classical violinists
Belgian classical violinists
Moscow Conservatory alumni
Academic staff of the Maastricht Academy of Music
Soviet emigrants to Belgium
Musicians from Yekaterinburg
21st-century classical violinists
20th-century Russian male musicians
21st-century Russian male musicians